Paparone is a surname. Notable people with the surname include:

Marco Paparone (born 1994), Australian rules footballer
Giovanni Paparoni (died  1153/1154, sometimes known as Giovanni Paparone), Italian cardinal

See also
Paparoni